Mount Race, is a prominent peak in the south Taconic Mountains of Massachusetts. The mountain is known for its waterfalls, steep, eastern ridgeline cliff face and expansive views of the Housatonic River valley and Berkshires to the east and of fellow Taconics to the south, west and north and Catskills and Hudson River valley to the west, for the traverse of the said cliffline and the summit grounds by the Appalachian Trail and for its old growth pitch pine and scrub oak summit ecosystem.

Details
Race Brook Falls, a popular waterfall, cascades from a common ledge between Mount Race and Mount Everett to the north. Another waterfall, Bear Rock Falls is located on the southeast side of the mountain along the Appalachian Trail. A primitive campsite is located near Race Brook Falls on the Race Brook Falls Trail.

The summit and west side of Mount Race is located in the town of Mount Washington; the east slopes are located in Sheffield, Massachusetts. Much of the upper areas of the mountain are located within the Mount Washington State Forest; other parcels are part of conservation easements.

The east side of the mountain drains into Race Brook and Bear Rock Brook, thence into Schenob Brook, the Hubbard Brook, the Housatonic River, and Long Island Sound; the south side drains into Plantain Pond, thence into Bear Rock Brook. The west side drains into City Brook, thence into Bash Bish Brook, the Roeliff Jansen Kill, the Hudson River, and New York Bay of the Atlantic Ocean.

See also
 List of old growth forests in Massachusetts

References
 Massachusetts Trail Guide (2004). Boston: Appalachian Mountain Club.

External links
 South Taconic Range trail map.
 Mount Washington State Forest. Massachusetts DCR.
 Mount Everett State Reservation. Massachusetts Department of Conservation and Recreation.
 Mount Washington State Forest map
 Berkshire Natural Resource Council
 Berkshire Chapter of the Appalachian Mountain Club
 Commonwealth Connections proposal PDF download. Retrieved March 2, 2008.
 Appalachian Trail Conservancy.

Race
Mountains of Berkshire County, Massachusetts